Special Police Squad "Bosna" was a special forces unit of the Ministry of Interior of the Republic of Bosnia and Herzegovina and a part of the Army of the Republic of Bosnia and Herzegovina, the official military of the wartime government of Bosnia.

History
The special unit of the Ministry of Interior grew out of the pre-war Republican special unit established in 1982. Like most European police special units, which were created in response to the tide of terrorism, this unit was formed from the above-average age of police officers, modernly equipped, and specially trained and to be ready to effectively act against terrorism.

The unit played a key role in the defense of Sarajevo during the siege. Some of the heaviest battles were fought by the unit, most battles ended in their favor which gained them enormous popularity. The members of the unit were informally called Vikićevi, meaning "the guys from commander Dragan Vikić."

The unit was mostly under the direct command of the presidency of the Republic of Bosnia and Herzegovina.

References

External links 
 Official website

Bosnian War
Military units and formations of the Army of the Republic of Bosnia and Herzegovina